Nannocampus is a genus of pipefishes native to the Indian and Pacific Oceans with these currently  recognized species :
 Nannocampus elegans J. L. B. Smith, 1953 (elegant pipefish)
 Nannocampus lindemanensis (Whitley, 1948) (painted pipefish)
 Nannocampus pictus (Duncker, 1915) (reef pipefish)
 Nannocampus subosseus Günther, 1870 (bony-headed pipefish)
 Nannocampus weberi Duncker, 1915 (reef-flat pipefish)

References

Syngnathidae
Marine fish genera
Ray-finned fish genera
Taxa named by Albert Günther